Grant County is a county located on the northern border of the U.S. state of Oklahoma. As of the 2010 census, the population was 4,527. Its county seat is Medford. Originally designated as part of the Cherokee Outlet, it was named County L in Oklahoma Territory at the time of its opening to non-Indian settlement. A county election renamed it for U.S. President Ulysses S. Grant.

History

Grant County was part of the Cherokee Nation's Cherokee Outlet until it was opened to non-Indian settlers in response to public demand on September 16, 1893. Settlers named the county after President Ulysses S. Grant in a general election held November 6, 1894. Congress originally designated this area as County L in Oklahoma Territory, with the county seat at Pond Creek. Medford became the county seat through an election held on May 27, 1908.

The Chicago, Kansas and Nebraska Railway (later the Chicago, Rock Island and Pacific Railway) built a railroad from northern Kansas through Grant County in 1889 and 1890. In 1897, the Gulf Railroad (later the Atchison, Topeka and Santa Fe Railway, AT&SF) linked Manchester, Wakita, Medford, and Deer Creek. At the start of the 20th century, the Blackwell, Enid and Southwestern Railroad (later the St. Louis and San Francisco Railway) passed through Lamont. Still later, the Denver, Enid and Gulf Railroad (later the AT&SF) reached Nash (Nashville).

The railroads gave the county access to markets in the northern and eastern U.S., helping turn the county into a major agriculture and cattle producer. At statehood, the principal crops were wheat, corn, oats, alfalfa, and forage sorghum. The county also had more than fourteen thousand each of hogs and cattle as well as almost thirteen thousand horses.

Bethel was the site of a post office in Grant County that existed from March 12, 1895, until November 2, 1895.

Florence was the site of a post office in Grant Co. that existed prior to 1908 but ceased to exist circa 1920, after the post office closed, per information acquired in researching an ancestor, Isaac Arnold, who was postmaster in Florence from August 1908 to 1920.

Geography
Most of the county is drained by the Salt Fork of the Arkansas River and its tributaries (Pond, Deer, Osage, and Crooked creeks). The Chikaskia River flows southeast from Kansas into the county's northeastern corner, then crosses east into Kay County.

The county is by the U.S. state of Kansas on the north, specifically Sumner and Harper counties. Adjacent counties in Oklahoma are Kay County to the east, Garfield County to the south, and Alfalfa County to the west.

Major highways
  U.S. Route 60
  U.S. Route 64
  U.S. Route 81
  State Highway 11
  State Highway 11A
  State Highway 74
  State Highway 132

Adjacent Counties
 Alfalfa County (west)
 Garfield County (south)
 Harper County, Kansas (northwest)
 Kay County (east)
 Noble County (southeast)
 Sumner County, Kansas (northeast)

Demographics

As of the 2010 census, the county's population was 4,527, a 12 percent decline from 5,144 at the 2000 census.  The population density was 4.5 people per square mile (1.7/km2).  There were 2,622 housing units at an average density of 3 per square mile (1/km2).  More than 90 percent of residents self-identified as white. Less than 3 percent of residents self-identified as Native American and less than 2 percent self-identified as Hispanic or Latino of any race. Less than 1 percent of the population self-identified as Black or African American, Asian, or Pacific Islander. Less than 2 percent of the population self-identified as of a race not listed or as from two or more races.

There were 2,089 households, out of which 30.7% had children under the age of 18 living with them, 60.4% were married couples living together, 6.3% had a female householder with no husband present, and 30.30% were non-families.  28.40% of households were made up of individuals, and 15.8% had someone living alone who was 65 years of age or older.  The average household size was 2.42 and the average family size was 2.95.

In the county, the population was spread out, with 25.2% under the age of 18, 6.50% from 18 to 24, 24.10% from 25 to 44, 22.80% from 45 to 64, and 21.40% who were 65 years of age or older.  The median age was 41 years. For every 100 females there were 94.40 males.  For every 100 females age 18 and over, there were 94.80 males.

The median income for a household in the county was $28,977, and the median income for a family was $35,833. Males had a median income of $26,837 versus $19,036 for females. The per capita income for the county was $15,709.  About 10.50% of families and 13.70% of the population were below the poverty line, including 19.60% of those under age 18 and 11.90% of those age 65 or over.

Politics

Political Culture

Economy
The county economy has largely been based on agriculture since before statehood. At statehood the principal crops included wheat, corn, oats, alfalfa, and forage sorghum with estimated value of $3.5 million. Farmers and ranchers had more than fourteen thousand each of hogs and cattle as well as almost thirteen thousand horses.

Oil and gas were discovered In the early 1920s in the eastern part of the county near the Blackwell Field. On April 24, 1921, the first oil well in Grant County, was drilled near Deer Creek.

Communities

Cities
 Medford
 Pond Creek

Towns
 Deer Creek
 Jefferson
 Lamont
 Manchester
 Nash
 Renfrow
 Wakita

Unincorporated communities
 Sand Creek
 Gibbon

NRHP sites

The following sites in Grant County are listed on the National Register of Historic Places:
 Bank of Nashville, Nash
 Dayton School, Lamont
 Deer Creek General Merchandise Store, Deer Creek
 Grant County Courthouse, Medford
 Medford Bathhouse and Swimming Pool, Medford

References

Further reading

 Shirk, George H. Oklahoma Place Names. Norman: University of Oklahoma Press, 1987.

External links
 Encyclopedia of Oklahoma History and Culture - Grant County
 Oklahoma Digital Maps: Digital Collections of Oklahoma and Indian Territory

 
1893 establishments in Oklahoma Territory
Populated places established in 1893